The seventh cycle of Britain & Ireland's Next Top Model premiered on 4 July 2011 on Sky Living. The show's title was changed from Britain's Next Top Model to Britain and Ireland's Next Top Model, as the show was broadcast in, and auditioned contestants from, the Republic of Ireland as well as the United Kingdom beginning with this cycle. The judging panel from the show's previous cycle remained unchanged.

Cycle 7 auditioned contestants in Glasgow, London, Cardiff, Birmingham, Manchester and Dublin in November and December 2010. This was the first and only installment of the series to feature an audition tour, which was covered in the first three episodes of the cycle. The series re-adopted the traditional casting week format for cycle 8 the following year.

The prizes for this cycle included a modelling contract with Models 1, a fashion spread and cover feature in Company magazine, a contract with Revlon cosmetics, an international fashion campaign for Miss Selfridge, a luxury holiday trip at Sandals Resorts in Jamaica courtesy of British Airways, and a brand new Peugeot RCZ

The winner of the competition was 20-year-old Jade Thompson from Stoke-on-Trent.

Runner-up of this competition Juste Juozapaityte was chosen as one of the 14 finalists in the fifth season of Russia's Next Top Model, which she once again placed second.

Cast

Contestants
(Ages stated are at start of contest)

Judges
Elle Macpherson (host)
Julien Macdonald
Charley Speed
Grace Woodward

Episodes

Result

 The contestant won the challenge
 The contestant was eliminated
 The contestant won the competition

Average  call-out order
Episode 4, 10 & 13 are not included.

Bottom two/three

 The contestant was eliminated after their first time in the bottom two
 The contestant was eliminated after their second time in the bottom two
 The contestant was eliminated in the semi-final judging and placed third
 The contestant was eliminated in the final judging and placed as the runner-up

Notes

References

External links 
 Official website

07
2011 British television seasons
2011 Irish television seasons
Television shows filmed in England
Television shows filmed in Miami